Ali Peyrovani (born 20 July 1985) is an Iranian football defender of Moghavemat Sepasi F.C. He is the son of Iranian football coach, Gholam Hossein Peyrovani.

References

1985 births
Living people
Iranian footballers
Fajr Sepasi players
Bargh Shiraz players
Association football defenders